Kevin Killian (December 24, 1952 – June 15, 2019) was an American poet, author, editor, and playwright primarily of LGBT literature. My Vocabulary Did This to Me: The Collected Poetry of Jack Spicer, which he co-edited with Peter Gizzi, won the American Book Award for poetry in 2009.

Killian was also co-founder of the Poets Theater, an influential poetry, stage, and performance group based in San Francisco as well as the New Narrative movement in San Francisco.

Life and career
Kevin Killian was born on December 24, 1952, in Smithtown, New York. He was raised Roman Catholic and attended a Roman Catholic parochial school run by Franciscan friars. He discussed these experiences in an essay in the edited work Wrestling with the Angel. He was also the New York City spelling bee champion. He attended Fordham University and graduate school at Stony Brook University in the 1970s.

Killian moved to San Francisco in 1980. A year later in 1981, he met fellow author Dodie Bellamy, both are bisexual. The couple were married for 34 years.

Killian admired the work of JT LeRoy (later to be revealed as the pen name and persona of author Laura Albert), and held public readings of LeRoy's work in 2000.

As a beginning novelist, Killian tied for first place in the "Hamming Up Hammett" Dashiell Hammett bad-writing contest in San Francisco in 1988. Author Dodie Bellamy featured him as a partially fictional character in her vampire novel The Letters of Mina Harker. His poetry has appeared in the anthology The Best American Poetry 1988, the magazine Discontents, and the anthology Good Times: Bad Trips. Killian once based a volume of poetry on the work of horror film director Dario Argento (motivated to do so as a response to the AIDS epidemic). Killian also helped author Alvin Orloff polish chapters of his novel Gutterboys. Noted author Edmund White described his work as "a kind of mandarin American casualness that is peculiar to … West Coast writers … a school of refined but deceptively offhand stylists." The Village Voice called My Vocabulary Did This to Me: The Collected Poetry of Jack Spicer, which he co-edited with Peter Gizzi, "impeccably edited". The work was also highly praised by The New York Times.

Killian's 2009 collection of short gay erotic fiction Impossible Princess won the Lambda Literary Foundation Award for best gay men's erotica. The first story in the collection, "Young Hank Williams," was written with Canadian cult writer Derek McCormack. The collection was inspired by Kylie Minogue's album of the same name and, in turn, it inspired Conrad Tao's piano composition "All I Had Forgotten Or Tried To".

Killian was founder and former director of Small Press Traffic. He also edited the poetry 'zine Mirage.

Killian died from cancer on June 15, 2019.

Poets Theater and retrospective work
Killian's interest in theatre emerged in the early 1980s when he saw experimental plays by Carla Harryman. Harryman and Tom Mandel subsequently cast him in their play Fist of the Colossus. He co-founded the Poets Theater in San Francisco, and acted in as well as wrote pieces for the group. As of 2001, he had written 31 plays. He co-authored the performance art piece The Red and the Green in 2005 with cinematographer Karla Milosevich. In 2009, Killian and David Brazil co-edited a collection of Poets Theater pieces, The Kenning Anthology of Poets Theatre: 1945–1985.

Killian was also active in bringing attention to important LGBTQ artists and writers of the 1960s, 1970s, and 1980s. He held poetry readings of a wide number of influential poets and writers and participated in a number of panels, art installations, retrospectives, and memorials. For example, in 2008 he was a featured speaker at a University of Maine "Poetry of the 1970s" conference. He and artist Colter Jacobsen also helped organize a tribute ("Kiki: The Proof Is in the Pudding") to the Kiki Gallery, an influential art gallery in San Francisco in the 1980s that featured the work of LGBTQ artists.

Published works

Story and poetry collections

Novels

Biographies
Poet Be Like God (co-written with Lewis Ellingham; Wesleyan University Press, 1998)

Edited works
The Wild Creatures by Sam D'Allesandro (Suspect Thoughts Press, 2005) 
My Vocabulary Did This to Me: The Collected Poetry of Jack Spicer (co-edited with Peter Gizzi; Wesleyan University Press, 2008) 
The Kenning Anthology of Poets Theater: 1945-1985 (co-edited with David Brazil; Kenning Editions, 2010) 
Writers Who Love Too Much: New Narrative Writing 1977-1997 (co-edited with Dodie Bellamy; Nightboat Books, 2017)

Plays
Stone Marmalade (co-written with Leslie Scalapino; Singing Horse Press, 1996) 
Often (co-written with Barbara Guest; Kenning Editions, 2001) 
Island of Lost Souls (Nomados, 2004)

References

External links
Links to online works by Kevin Killian
Kevin Killian and Dodie Bellamy Papers. Yale Collection of American Literature, Beinecke Rare Book and Manuscript Library.

1952 births
2019 deaths
People from Smithtown, New York
Writers from New York (state)
Writers from San Francisco
Lambda Literary Award winners
American LGBT dramatists and playwrights
American male novelists
20th-century American novelists
21st-century American novelists
American LGBT poets
American LGBT novelists
American male short story writers
20th-century American poets
20th-century American dramatists and playwrights
21st-century American poets
American male poets
American male dramatists and playwrights
20th-century American short story writers
21st-century American short story writers
PEN Oakland/Josephine Miles Literary Award winners
American Book Award winners
20th-century American male writers
21st-century American male writers
California College of the Arts faculty
LGBT people from New York (state)
American bisexual writers